Sadani is one of two places in Tanzania with this name.  This is the one in Tanga Region, near the coast.

History
In the East African campaign of World War I the British Royal Navy bombarded Sadani, first with the monitor  on 26 July 1916 and then with the battleship  on 3 August. This led the German East African authorities in Sadani to surrender to British land and naval forces.

Transport
Both namesakes are served by nearby stations on the national railway network.

See also
 Railway stations in Tanzania

References

Populated places in Tanga Region